Avalanche is the second studio album by Danish soul pop duo Quadron. It was released on 31 May 2013 through Vested in Culture and Epic Records. Upon its release, Avalanche received positive reviews from music critics. At Metacritic, which assigns a normalized rating out of 100 to reviews from mainstream critics, the album received an average score of 72, which indicates "generally favorable reviews", based on nine reviews. Despite its positive reception, the album was a relative commercial failure, only peaking at number 115 on the Billboard 200 in the United States. In the group's native Denmark the album achieved greater commercial success, spending 12 weeks in the top 10 of the charts and was eventually certified gold for 10,000 copies sold.

Track listing

Notes
 signifies a vocal producer

Personnel
Credits adapted from Allmusic.

Marcel Camargo - guitar
Derek "MixedByAli" Ali – arrangement, engineer, producer
Anita Marisa Boriboon – design
Delbert Bowers – mixing assistant
Pablo Calogero – baritone saxophone
Errol Cooney – guitar
Claire Courchene – cello
Thomas Drayton – bass
Fraser T Smith – composer, drums, percussion, piano, producer
Chris Galland – mixing assistant
Robin Hannibal – arrangement, composer, engineer, instrumentation, mixing assistant, producer
Kuk Harrell – engineer, vocal engineer, vocal producer
Eliot Hazel – photography
Hans Hvidberg – drums
Peter Jacobsen – cello
Coco O. – art direction, composer, lyrics, vocals
Dave Kutch – mastering
Kendrick Lamar – composer
Elizabeth Lea – trombone
Tom Lea – viola, violin
Dan Lead – guitar, pedal steel guitar
Alan Lightner – steel drums
Manny Marroquin – mixing
Gloria Noto – make-up
Chris "Tek" O'Ryan – engineer
Sylvia Rhone – executive producer
August Rosenbaum – composer, keyboards, organ, synthesizer
John Ruggiero – hair stylist
Andrew Schwartz – engineer
Todd Simon – flugelhorn, trumpet
Tricky Stewart – executive producer
Ali Tamposi – composer
Marcos Tovar –	engineer
Steven Valenzuela – engineer
Tracy Wannomae – clarinet, flute, saxophone

Chart positions

Release history

References

2013 albums
Epic Records albums
Quadron albums